Jamie Golder (born February 21, 1962) is an American former professional tennis player.

Biography
Born in Fort Lauderdale, Golder played college tennis for the University of Miami before joining the professional tour.

During her professional career she featured in the main draw of all four grand slam tournaments, most notably at the 1984 French Open, where she had an opening round win over fourth seed Andrea Jaeger, who retired hurt after losing the first set 5–7.

Golder won a silver medal behind Ronni Reis in the women's singles event at the 1985 Maccabiah Games in Israel.

She was the second wife of actor and comedian Art Metrano.

References

External links
 
 

1962 births
Living people
American female tennis players
Jewish tennis players
Jewish American sportspeople
Maccabiah Games silver medalists for the United States
Competitors at the 1985 Maccabiah Games
Miami Hurricanes women's tennis players
Tennis people from Florida
Sportspeople from Fort Lauderdale, Florida
Maccabiah Games medalists in tennis
21st-century American Jews
21st-century American women